Treasa Ní Cheannabháin (born 1953) is a notable Irish singer in the sean-nós tradition. She was born in Cill Chiaráin in Carna, Conamara, an Irish-speaking area, and three of her daughters are also well known as singers. She is married to Saber Elsafty, a doctor of Egyptian origin, and is also known for her activism on behalf of Palestinian civil rights.

Both her immediate and extended family are musical. Her mother was a second cousin of the distinguished sean-nós singer Seosamh Ó hÉanaí, and another notable singer, Peadar Ó Ceannabháin, is a cousin. Treasa won Corn na mBan (the Women's Cup for singing) at the Oireachtas in 1995 and was runner-up in Corn Uí Riada, another prestigious competition.

In 1996 Treasa and daughter Róisín Elsafty released an album on the French label Musique du Monde label entitled L'art du sean-nós.

Activism
In 2008 she slipped across the Egyptian border into Gaza with her daughter Naisrín Elsafty and a niece in order to distribute €7,700 collected by the Galway-Palestinian Children's Fund. They were arrested and briefly detained, and Treasa's husband had his passport confiscated to prevent him helping Treasa to leave.

The collection of the money had been aided by the release of a CD in Irish and Arabic, entitled An Phailistín, to which well-known Irish musicians Sharon Shannon and Donal Lunny contributed.

References

1953 births
20th-century Irish women singers
21st-century Irish women singers
Living people
Musicians from County Galway
Sean-nós singers